Superstore is an American sitcom television series that aired on NBC from November 30, 2015, to March 25, 2021. The series was created and produced by Justin Spitzer. Starring America Ferrera and Ben Feldman (who both also serve as executive producers), Superstore follows a group of employees working at Cloud 9, a fictional big-box chain store in St. Louis, Missouri. The ensemble cast includes Lauren Ash, Colton Dunn, Nico Santos, Nichole Sakura, Mark McKinney, and Kaliko Kauahi. A Spanish-language adaptation, titled Supertitlán, debuted on the Mexican television network Azteca 7 on 30 May 2022.

As of January 2023, Superstore is streaming on Netflix, Hulu, and Peacock.

Cast and characters

Main

Recurring

Notable guest stars
 Fred Armisen as a representative for a charity.
 Eliza Coupe as employee magazine reporter.
 Howie Mandel as himself, a comedian whom Dina mistakes as a newly hired Cloud 9 employee.
 Natasha Leggero as an alleged shoplifter.
 Cecily Strong as fictional Olympic gymnast Missy Jones.
 Tony Plana as Ron Sosa, Amy's father. (In Ferrera's previous series, Ugly Betty, Plana also played her character's father.)
 Marlene Forte as Connie Sosa, Amy's mother.
 Brenda Song as Kristen, Glenn's foster daughter and former love interest of Jonah.
 Felipe Esparza as Cody, a stoner stockroom associate.
 Brian Howe as Neil Penderson, Cloud 9 CEO.
 Fred Melamed as Richard Simms, Jonah's father.
 Meagen Fay as Marilyn Simms, Jonah's mother.
 Eden Sher as Penny, a young woman who works at Cloud 9 for one day.
 Chrissy Metz as Luanne, a Cloud 9 corporate employee who investigates the source of damning Tweets at the store.
 Anjelah Johnson as Robin Green, union leader.
 Jason Ritter as Josh Simms, Jonah's brother.
 Sean Gunn as Card Shopper
 Dean Norris as Howard Fox, Dina Fox's estranged father
 Affion Crockett as Tommy, organizer at the Raise the Wage protest
 Jacob Wysocki as Frisco, friend of Bo (Cheyenne's husband)
 Dave Foley as Lowell Anderson, son of Cloud 9's founder

Episodes

Production

Development and filming
The series was one of three pilots picked up by NBC on January 14, 2015. The series was the first project for Ruben Fleischer's newly-formed company The District as part of a two-year deal with Universal, as he directed the pilot episode. Superstore was officially picked up as a series on May 7, 2015, by NBC. The first season consisted of eleven episodes, after the episode order was reduced from thirteen on October 19, 2015. NBC announced on November 2, 2015, that the series would premiere on Monday, January 4, 2016, but before the premiere it would air two back-to-back episodes on November 30, 2015, following The Voice.

On February 23, 2016, the series was renewed for a second season by NBC. On May 15, 2016, NBC announced that the series would lead off its Thursday night primetime programming in the 2016–17 season. The second season premiered on September 22, 2016, with a 22-episode order that was announced on September 23, 2016. The season concluded on May 4, 2017. A special Olympics-themed episode aired on August 19, 2016, during the network's coverage of the 2016 Rio Summer Olympics. On February 21, 2018, NBC renewed the series for a 22-episode fourth season, which premiered on October 4, 2018. On March 4, 2019, NBC renewed the series for a fifth season, which premiered on September 26, 2019. On February 11, 2020, the series was renewed for a sixth season. In March 2020, production on the show was shut down due to the COVID-19 pandemic, which resulted in the fifth season having 21 episodes instead of the originally-planned 22. The sixth season began filming on September 8, 2020. The season premiered on October 29, 2020. In December 2020, NBC announced that the sixth season would be its last. Production on the final season was completed on February 28, 2021. The series finale aired on March 25, 2021.

Casting
It was announced on February 20, 2015, that Lauren Ash had been cast as a series regular, and would be playing Dina, the store's assistant manager. On March 2, 2015, Deadline reported that Superstore had added three other cast members: Colton Dunn, Mark McKinney and Nico Santos. The website reported that Dunn would be playing Garrett, the often-sarcastic narrator of the piece, McKinney would be playing Glenn, the intense store manager, and Santos would be playing Mateo, another new employee and a brown-noser from an impoverished background. On March 12, 2015, Nichole Sakura was announced to have joined the show as Cheyenne, a pregnant teenage employee.

Deadline announced on March 13, 2015, that Ben Feldman had landed the male lead in Superstore, as Jonah, a new employee in the superstore Cloud 9. Three days later, TVLine announced on March 16, 2015, that America Ferrera had landed the female lead as the floor supervisor Amy in the Cloud 9 store. It was also reported that Ferrera was also a producer for the show.

On May 22, 2019, NBC announced that recurring cast member Kaliko Kauahi who portrays Cloud 9 worker Sandra has been upped to a series regular for the fifth season.

America Ferrera's departure
After NBC had initially announced the sixth season renewal of the series, the network revealed on February 28, 2020, that series star America Ferrera, would be departing the series at the end of the fifth season citing a desire to work on new projects and to spend more time with her family.

After production of the fifth season was cut short by one episode due to the COVID-19 pandemic, Ferrera noted her departure from the show might be delayed into season 6 in order to give her character's arc a proper closure. Ultimately, Ferrera was in the first two episodes of the sixth season as well as the final three episodes.

Crossovers
Different Cloud 9 store locations have appeared in other series produced by NBCUniversal Television, including Hulu's The Mindy Project, NBC's Good Girls and I Feel Bad.

Cloud 9 Superstore

The Cloud 9 Superstore is a fictional big box store. In addition to typical American everyday products, Cloud 9 sells guns and liquor, and has a pharmacy. Cloud 9 has its own credit union for its employees, in addition to a photo studio. The spokesman for Cloud 9 was Daniel Hertzler (as Kyle the Cloud 9 Cloud), until he was arrested and charged with cannibalism.

The corporation, which is based in Chicago, Illinois, does not offer paid maternity leave, health insurance, or paid overtime to its employees. Under Cloud 9 policy, employees may take one bathroom break per shift, and are allotted 15 minutes for lunch.

In an effort to control what is happening in the individual stores, all locks and lights, as well as temperature control and music, are controlled from the corporate office. In 2017, Cloud 9 changed its store brand from Halo to Super Cloud. Cloud 9 also has its own magazine called Stratus.

The main characters for the show work at store 1217, the "Ozark Highlands" store, which is located in St. Louis, Missouri, on Ozark Highlands Road. The store fell under Jeff Sutin, who was district manager from 2006 to 2018, and then again from late 2020 (formerly Laurie Neustadt in 2018 and Maya from 2019 to 2020). The store was destroyed by a tornado during the season 2 finale, and reopened during the season 3 premiere. Other area locations include Kirkwood, Fenton, Easton, and Bel-Ridge. Additionally, there are locations mentioned in Austin, Texas, and in Detroit, Michigan. Cloud 9 has locations in multiple countries, with stores in Beijing, Mumbai, Paris, Vancouver, Taipei, and Mexico City.

The pilot was shot at a redressed Kmart in Burbank, California (with Kmart signage visible throughout the episode), but the rest of the series was shot on sets constructed on two soundstages.

Reception

Ratings
The series debuted as a "preview" on November 30, 2015, following an episode of The Voice with 7 million viewers, making it the second highest new comedy behind Life in Pieces. The series then moved to its regular Monday at 8:00 pm timeslot on January 4, 2016, with more than 6 million viewers making the highest rated NBC comedy that did not have The Voice as a lead-in since The Michael J. Fox Show back in September 2013.

Critical reception

On Metacritic, the first season has a score of 58 out of 100, indicating "mixed or average reviews" based on reviews from 21 critics. On Rotten Tomatoes, the first season has a 66% rating, based on reviews from 35 critics, with an average rating of 5.00/10. The site's consensus is: "Superstores talented cast and obvious potential are slightly overshadowed by a tonally jumbled presentation and thin, formulaic writing."  

As the first season went along, reviews started to become more positive. Following the finale "Labor", the Los Angeles Times called it one of TV's best new comedies." Pilot Viruet of The A.V. Club wrote that the "first season ... got better and more confident as it moved on", and that the first-season finale "is a nice little cap to a nice little sitcom that could’ve used a little more attention." After the series aired its Olympics special, Variety wrote that the show was "a funny, pointed and essential workplace comedy", and that "there are no weak links in [the] ensemble".

The second season was lauded by critics and has a 100% approval rating on Rotten Tomatoes, based on reviews from 7 critics. The third season has 100% approval rating on Rotten Tomatoes based on reviews from 11 critics. The site's consensus reads, "Superstore graduates from the clearance section of network comedies to stake its claim as one of the most lovable ensembles on television, fleshing out its charming cast while expertly teasing out its central romance." The fourth season received critical acclaim with critics saying "Superstore remains a furtively fearless riot in its comedic approach to heavy, timely issues." with a score of 100% on Rotten Tomatoes based on 15 reviews. The fifth season received critical acclaim with a score of 100% on Rotten Tomatoes based on 9 reviews. The sixth season has received positive reviews with a score of 92% on Rotten Tomatoes based on 13 reviews.

Accolades

Cancelled spin-off
In December 2020, it was reported that a spin-off, titled Bo & Cheyenne and starring Johnny Pemberton and Nichole Sakura, was in early development at NBC. The series was to be a co-production between Spitzer Holding Company, The District, and Universal Television, with Bridget Kyle and Vicky Luu as writers. On March 25, 2021, following Superstores series finale, the showrunners stated that they did not factor the potential spin-off into the episode because its development was still in early stages. The following day Kyle said in an interview that the project appeared dead, stating, "Unfortunately, yesterday, NBC notified us that they're not going forward with the Superstore spin-off."

Spanish-language adaptation
In February 2021, it was reported that a Spanish-language adaptation, titled Supertitlán, was in development. Filming took place from July to November 2021. On November 1, 2021, the main cast was announced. The series premiered on May 30, 2022. The first season consists of 48 episodes.

Home media

Notes

See also 
Trollied, a similar British series developed and broadcast some years earlier, which may have been an inspiration for the series.
Chuck (TV series), a comedy spy series set in a fictional big box appliance store.

References

External links
 
 
 

2015 American television series debuts
2021 American television series endings
2010s American LGBT-related comedy television series
2020s American LGBT-related comedy television series
2010s American single-camera sitcoms
2020s American single-camera sitcoms
2010s American workplace comedy television series
2020s American workplace comedy television series
American LGBT-related sitcoms
English-language television shows
NBC original programming
 
Television series by Universal Television
Television series set in shops
Television shows featuring audio description
Television shows set in St. Louis
Mass media portrayals of the working class